The 2018 North Texas Mean Green football team represented the University of North Texas in the 2018 NCAA Division I FBS football season. The Mean Green played their home games at the Apogee Stadium in Denton, Texas, and competed in the West Division of Conference USA (C–USA). They were led by third-year head coach Seth Littrell. They finished the season 9–4, 5–3 in C-USA play to finish in a three-way tie for second place in the West Division. They were invited to the New Mexico Bowl where they lost to Utah State.

Following a 44–17 victory over Arkansas and a 3–0 record, the Mean Green received votes in both the AP Poll (4 votes) and Coaches Poll (5 votes), the first time since 2013 that North Texas received votes in a poll.

Previous season
The Mean Green finished the 2017 season 9–5, 7–1 in C-USA play to win the West Division. They lost the C-USA Championship Game to Florida Atlantic. They received an invite to the New Orleans Bowl where they lost to Troy.

Preseason

Award watch lists

Listed in the order that they were released

Preseason All-CUSA team
Conference USA released their preseason all-CUSA team on July 16, 2018, with the Mean Green having two players selected.

Offense

Mason Fine – QB

Jalen Guyton – WR

Preseason media poll
Conference USA released their preseason media poll on July 17, 2018, with the Mean Green predicted to finish as champions of the West Division.

Schedule
North Texas announced its 2018 football schedule on January 23, 2018. The 2018 schedule consists of  six home and six away games in the regular season. The Mean Green will host C–USA opponents Florida Atlantic, Louisiana Tech, Rice, and Southern Miss, and will travel to Old Dominion, UAB, UTEP, and UTSA.

The Mean Green hosted two of their four non-conference opponents, SMU from the American Athletic Conference and Incarnate Word from the FCS Southland Conference, and traveled to Arkansas from the Southeastern Conference and Liberty which is a FBS Independent. North Texas won all four non-conference games to begin the season.

Schedule Source:

Game summaries

SMU

The Mean Green's offense went off with 529 total yards, including 444 passing yards from junior quarterback Mason Fine. North Texas's defense held SMU's offense to only 256 yards, forced a turnover, and held the Mustangs scoreless through the first three quarters. 29,519 people attended the game, setting an attendance record at Apogee Stadium. This record would be broken 4 weeks later against Louisiana Tech.

Incarnate Word

at Arkansas

at Liberty

Kickoff was delayed until 6:48 p.m. due to rain and lightning. With the victory, the Mean Green started a season 4–0 for the first time since 1966.

Louisiana Tech

at UTEP

Southern Miss

at UAB

Rice

at Old Dominion

Florida Atlantic

at UTSA

vs. Utah State (New Mexico Bowl)

Statistics

Scoring
Scores against non-conference opponents

Scores against C-USA

Scores against all opponents

Awards
 Head coach Seth Littrell has been selected to join the American Football Coaches Association board of trustees along with Stanford head coach David Shaw and North Dakota State University head coach Chris Klieman.

Coaching changes
 Tashard Choice Named Mean Green Running Backs Coach

References

North Texas
North Texas Mean Green football seasons
North Texas Mean Green football